Nikolai Petrovich Zagorsky (20 November 1849 – 30 December 1893) was a Russian genre painter.

Biography
Nikolai Zagorsky was born on 20 November 1849 in Saint Petersburg. His father was a landowner from the Ryazan Governorate. In 1849 Nikolai Zagorsky enrolled in the Imperial Academy of Arts and from 1875 began participating in the Academy's exhibitions. In 1891, he joined the Society for Travelling Art Exhibitions (Peredvizhniki).

Zagorsky died in Saint Petersburg on 30 December 1893.

Works
Zagorsky created mainly genre paintings, and also draw portraits. In addition, he painted for the Petersburg magazines  and Sever. Zagorsky is the author of illustrations for the Big Album to the Works of A. S. Pushkin.

The artist's works are held in the collections of museums in Russia and Ukraine.

Gallery

References

1849 births
1893 deaths
Russian genre painters
19th-century painters from the Russian Empire
Painters from Saint Petersburg
Peredvizhniki